Boys and Girls Alone is a British reality TV program made for Channel 4 and first broadcast in 2009.

Plot
A four-part series, the programme featured 20 children aged between eight and eleven, living without adults in a pair of "villages", one for each sex.

During the last three episodes each group had a task to complete. They were given the responsibility of money, a three-day camping trip which included the girls skinning and eating a rabbit and the boys fishing for food, and in the finale, living with the opposite sex.

During the first few days one of the boys left because he could not cook the food they had in the house. It then became too much of a struggle and he was missing his family.

Controversy

The series attracted considerable press attention over allegations of "child abuse and cruelty". As a result, the UK government has "ordered a review of child employment laws". Although there was much dispute over the fact that boys and girls would be living alone, they were provided with food, money and hygiene equipment, and there were trained chaperons that would step in if a child's safety was compromised.
The UK regulator for TV and Radio OFCOM received over 180 complaints regarding the points stated above.

See also
 Kid Nation - A U.S television show that attracted similar controversy

References

Channel 4 original programming
2009 controversies
2009 British television series debuts
2009 British television series endings
2000s British reality television series
Television controversies in the United Kingdom